Whom the Gods Would Destroy is a 1970 novel by Richard P. Powell.

Whom the Gods Would Destroy or Whom (the) Gods Destroy may also refer to:
 "Whom the gods would destroy, they first make mad", a phrase used in English literature since at least the 17th century

Literature
 Whom Gods Destroy (comics), a 1996 comic book series by Chris Claremont
 The Mighty Thor: I, Whom The Gods Would Destroy, a 1988 graphic novel in the Marvel Graphic Novel line

Film and television
 Whom the Gods Destroy (1916 film), an American silent drama film
 Whom the Gods Destroy (1934 film), an American drama film
 Whom the Gods Would Destroy (film), a 1919 American film
 "Whom Gods Destroy" (Star Trek: The Original Series), an episode of Star Trek
 "Whom the Gods Would Destroy", an episode of Lewis series 1

See also
 Those Whom the Gods Detest, a 2009 album by Nile